John Charles Bottarini (September 14, 1908 – October 8, 1976) was a right-handed catcher for the Chicago Cubs during the 1937 season. He did not see much playing time as the Cubs were anchored behind the plate by future Hall of Famer Gabby Hartnett. Bottarini appeared in 26 games for the Cubs that season and put up decent offensive numbers, hitting .275 in 40 at-bats with three runs, three doubles, a home run and 7 RBI. He made 19 appearances in the field—18 at catcher and one in the outfield. He handled 53 total chances (44 putouts, 9 assists) at catcher perfectly for a 1.000 fielding percentage.

Before his season in Chicago, Bottarini played for the Los Angeles Angels of the Pacific Coast League. After the 1937 season, Bottarini was sold to Memphis of the minor league Southern Association. He would never play in the major leagues again.

Bottarini died by drowning after a boating accident on October 8, 1976 in Jemez Springs, New Mexico.

References

External links

 

1908 births
1976 deaths
Accidental deaths in New Mexico
Albuquerque Dukes players
Baseball players from California
Boating accident deaths
Chicago Cubs players
Clovis Pioneers players
Los Angeles Angels (minor league) players
Major League Baseball catchers
Memphis Chickasaws players
Pampa Oilers players
San Francisco Seals (baseball) players
Seattle Indians players
Sweetwater Swatters players
Syracuse Chiefs players
Temple Eagles players
Tulsa Oilers (baseball) players
People from Contra Costa County, California